Inape rigidsocia is a species of moth of the family Tortricidae. It is found in Ecuador (Pichincha Province).

The ground colour of the forewings is whitish with a slight admixture of brownish and pale brownish in the apical portion. The dots and strigulae are brown and the markings are dark brown. The hindwings are whitish, mixed with brownish in the apical portion.

Etymology
The species name refers to the character of the socius and is derived from Latin rigidus (meaning rigid).

References

Moths described in 2008
Endemic fauna of Ecuador
Moths of South America
rigidsocia
Taxa named by Józef Razowski